K.O. Victoria Lieu was a Chinese entomologist known for her studies of Aegeriidae (mulberry borers) and Cerambycidae (citrus borers).

References 

Chinese entomologists
Women entomologists
Chinese women biologists